The AAPG Bulletin is a monthly peer-reviewed scientific journal covering geosciences and associated technologies relating to the energy industry. It is an official journal of the American Association of Petroleum Geologists. The current editor-in-chief is Mattthew J. Pranter (University of Oklahoma).

Abstracting and indexing
This journal is abstracted and/or indexed in: GeoRef, GEOBASE, Scopus, PubMed, Current Contents, and Web of Science.

References

External links

Publications established in 1917
Geology journals
English-language journals
Monthly journals